Kiva (commonly known by its domain name, Kiva.org) is a 501(c)(3) non-profit organization headquartered in San Francisco, California, that claims to allow people to lend money via the Internet to low-income entrepreneurs and students in 80 countries.  Kiva's mission is "to expand financial access to help underserved communities thrive." They have been accused of deceptive business practices, misleading donors into believing their funds would be used for specific individuals and misrepresenting other aspects of their operations.

Kiva distributes funds that it receives to microfinance institutions, social impact businesses, schools or non-profit organizations and does not generally directly provide funds to specific individuals. These organizations are charged fees by Kiva and borrowers pay interest on most loans. 

Kiva is supported by grants, loans, and donations from its users, corporations, and national institutions. Since 2005, Kiva has crowd-funded more than 1.6 million loans, totaling over $1.68 billion, with a repayment rate of 96.3 percent. Over 2 million lenders worldwide use the Kiva platform. Despite its size, independent review by GiveWell failed to find evidence that the organization produces significant social benefit, with at least one partner supposedly vetted by Kiva earning high profits while having a very high recipient drop-out rate.

History 

Kiva was founded in October 2005 by Matt Flannery and Jessica Jackley. The couple's initial interest in microfinance was inspired by a 2003 lecture given by Grameen Bank's Muhammad Yunus at Stanford Business School. Jackley worked at the school and invited Flannery to attend the presentation. Soon after, Jackley began working as a consultant for the nonprofit Village Enterprise, which worked to help start small businesses in East Africa. While Flannery was visiting Jackley in Africa, the two spent time interviewing entrepreneurs about the problems they faced in starting ventures and found the lack of access to start-up capital was a common theme. After returning from Africa, the two began developing their plan for a microfinance project that would grow into Kiva, which means "unity" in Swahili.

In April 2005, Kiva's first seven loans were funded, totaling $3,500, and the original entrepreneurs were subsequently deemed the "Dream Team".

Lending process 
Kiva works with more than 300 microfinance institutions, social impact businesses, schools and non-profit organizations around the world, called "Field Partners", that post profiles of qualified local entrepreneurs on the Kiva website. Lenders browse borrower profiles on kiva.org and choose an entrepreneur they wish to fund. The lenders transfer their funds to Kiva through credit card processing or PayPal, which waives its transaction fee in these cases. Lenders can loan money in increments of $25.

After receiving lenders' money, Kiva aggregates loan capital from the individual lenders and transfers it to the appropriate Field Partners, which  disburse the loan to the borrower. Kiva does not charge interest on the capital sent to Field Partners, but often Field Partners do charge some level of interest to borrowers to cover administration costs. Interest is typically higher on loans from microfinance institutions in developing countries than interest rates on larger loans in developed countries because of the administrative costs of overseeing many tiny loans, and the increased risk.  As the entrepreneurs repay their loans with interest, the Field Partners remit funds back to Kiva. As the loan is repaid, the Kiva lenders can withdraw their principal or re-lend it to another entrepreneur.

Finances 
As of March 15, 2016, Kiva had distributed $827,356,850 in loans from 1,394,336 lenders to 1,928,760 borrowers, and a total of 1,036,558 loans had been funded through Kiva.  The average loan size is $411.26, and the average Kiva user has made 10.17 loans. Kiva's current repayment rate for all its partners is 97.1%. 

For the fiscal year 2012, Kiva made $15,632,786 in total revenue and had $12,482,528 in total expenses, leaving $3,150,258 to invest. The organization's net assets in 2012 totaled $16,248,638. Kiva itself does not charge interest on its loans; they supply capital to microfinancing institutions for free. These microfinancing institutions then lend out money with high interest compared to bank finance in mature markets, averaging a portfolio yield of over 30%. The organization's main sources of funding are grants, financial backing, and discounted services from many major national corporations and institutions. Chevron Corporation, Visa Inc., and Skoll Foundation awarded Kiva a two-year $1 million grant, $1.5 million grant, and $1 million grant respectively. Kiva also won a $1 million grant in Sam's Club's "Giving Made Simple" campaign and $500,000 in American Express's "Take Part" competition. Additionally, Omidyar Network awarded Kiva a $5 million grant over five years to help Kiva expand its field partners and support due diligence.

Management
In 2020, according to their own 990 tax form, Kiva's CEO Neville Crawley made $818,852 that year. Their total revenue was $38.6M. In 2015, the non-profit employed seventeen persons with salaries totaling more than $100,000. The average salary at Kiva is $80,768. As of 2019, they started paying interns.

Areas of work and loan use

Female-owned businesses 
As of October 2017, 81% of Kiva's loans have been made to women. 

In their non-fiction book Half the Sky, Nicholas D. Kristof and Sheryl WuDunn highlight Kiva's work along with that of some field partner organizations, such as the Kashf Foundation in Pakistan. Kristof and WuDunn noted the risky nature of microloans as a path out of poverty, but endorsed Kiva and similar microfinance efforts, writing that "microfinance has done more to bolster the status of women, and to protect them from abuse, than any laws could accomplish."

Green loans 
In 2011 Kiva added a new category of loans to help borrowers move to cleaner and safer forms of energy, green agriculture, transport and recycling. Green Kiva loans help fund solar panels, organic fertilizers, high-efficiency stoves, drip irrigation systems, and biofuels. As of December 2013, Kiva lenders had crowd-funded 4,600 green loans.

Support for higher education
In 2010, Kiva began a Student Microloans program that allowed lenders to help support students seeking access to higher education. Student loans are funded with the same crowd-funding approach, and typically students have 1–3 years to pay back their loans.

In 2014, the education offerings on Kiva expanded greatly when the organization began a deeper partnership with Vittana. Vittana works on the ground in countries in Asia, Africa and Latin America, developing loan alternatives for low-income students. Through the partnership, all loans sourced by Vittana now appear on Kiva for funding.

Medical loans

Some Kiva field partners, such as Alivio Capital, specialize in funding medical loans. Others may fund medical loans as well as other loans. A development scholar in Ghana has suggested that microfinance medical loans can be an effective way to close the gap in medical care access in developing countries.

Support for refugees

In July 2017, Kiva launched a World Refugee Fund, a $250,000 matching fund to provide support to refugees and host communities in countries including Lebanon, Jordan, and Turkey. As refugees repay the loans, they build a track record in their new locations. The fund is to be followed by a rotating fund of up to $9M in loan capital.

Other Kiva programs

Kiva U.S. 

In 2011, Kiva launched Kiva U.S., a 0% interest peer-to-peer lending pilot program for entrepreneurs in the United States, as part of efforts to "cut lending costs through technology". The loans posted to Kiva U.S. are often from borrowers who have been rejected for loans by traditional banking institutions, but on Kiva U.S. they do not need to be able to produce high credit scores or collateral. Kiva U.S. uses a system of trustees, who vouch for the borrowers. Kiva U.S. trustees can be local non-profits, service organizations, businesses, faith organizations or community leaders.

The average loan size for US borrowers is $5,000. US borrowers average about two years to repay loans.

Kiva Labs 

Google awarded a $3 million Global Impact Award to Kiva in 2013 to fund the Kiva Labs project, which looks for ways to increase the flexibility and impact of microfinance. Labs initiatives include lowering interest rates, providing more flexible repayment terms that accommodate issues like seasonal profits in farming, and offering longer-term loans for investments like education. Labs also focuses on providing access to clean energy technology and using mobile technology in ways that will bridge the knowledge gap. At the time of the lab's launch, Kiva lenders had crowdfunded "132,000 agricultural loans; 4,600 green loans, and 670 mobile tech loans."

Kiva City

Kiva City provides local business owners and entrepreneurs in U.S. cities with the opportunity to crowdsource loans. It was launched by Kiva and former US President Bill Clinton at the Clinton Global Initiative America conference in Chicago in 2011.  Kiva City locations include:  Detroit, New Orleans, Los Angeles, Washington D.C., Newark, Richmond, Little Rock, Pittsburgh, Philadelphia, Milwaukee, Louisville, San Francisco, New York City, and Oakland.

In less than a year, the Kiva City programs in Richmond, Virginia, helped fund more than $100,000 in loans to local businesses.

Controversies

Interest rates 

As of November 2018, a total of 1,530,180 loans had been funded on Kiva. The following table shows these loans sorted according to interest rate.

Some people, including microfinance pioneer Muhammad Yunus, argue that the interest rates of many microcredit institutions are unreasonably high. In his 2007 book he argues that microfinance institutions that charge more than 15% above their long-term operating costs should face penalties.

According to its web site, Kiva quotes interest rates as the "self reported average rate charged by the Field Partner to the entrepreneur." Kiva does not publish the interest rates charged for the individual loans funded through its website.  However, it does publish the average "Portfolio Yield" of each of its field partners, as a way for prospective lenders to estimate the cost to the borrower of the loans they consider funding.  The "Portfolio Yield" measures the average income earned from the field partner's outstanding loan portfolio.  Some observers have pointed out that the "Portfolio Yield" measure is unreliable, and does not directly reflect the actual price that borrowers are paying for the loans.

Kiva defends the interest rates of its field partners, however, saying its field partners provide much better rates than local alternatives, but must charge what they do because "the costs of making a micro-loan in the developing world are higher versus larger loans in the West." Kiva itself does not keep any of the interest collected, but operates instead exclusively on donations.

For example, in 2009, micro-loans from Kiva partners in Guatemala averaged 23.16% for the equivalent of US$430 lent on average, comparable to the commercial BanRural rate of 24.5% for a loan of US$635. (For reference, the inflation rate for Guatemala typically varies between 5 and 10% and was just 0.62% in 2009).

Kiva itself launched a more direct peer-to-peer microlending platform, called Kiva Zip, in 2012.  Kiva Zip transfers funds directly to borrowers without outsourcing disbursements and repayment collection to field partners.  Instead, Kiva Zip partners with local institutions called Trustees, who vet loan applicants, provide mentorship, and may post profiles and updates on their behalf.  Currently, Kiva Zip borrowers do not pay any interest or fees.  Lenders are protected from currency risk but do not earn interest.  Kiva Zip is considered an experimental platform, and offers loans in the United States and in Kenya.  In the future, it hopes to expand to other locations.  Kiva Zip's repayment rate is 89.4%.

Interest rates by field partner

As of November 2018, there are a total of 332 field partners listed on the Kiva website and their status is as follows: 173 Active, 41 Inactive, 14 Paused, and 104 Experimental. In addition, 178 former field partners are listed as Closed.

The following table shows the "portfolio yield" of a sampling of field partners. "Portfolio yield" figures are calculated by dividing all interest and fees paid by borrowers to the field partner by the average loan portfolio of the field partner that given year. The figure provides a more accurate insight into the costs of borrowing because it includes fees associated with borrowing.

Pre-disbursement of funds

When Kiva began, borrowers had to wait until their loans were funded on the Kiva website to receive the funds. Since then, the system has changed, so that loans are disbursed to borrowers before their stories are posted to Kiva's website. Disbursing loans sooner has a positive impact on the borrowers, who no longer need to wait weeks to receive their funding and can thus take advantage of time-sensitive business opportunities. This is disclosed on Kiva's site; each loan proposal states whether funds were pre-disbursed. Thus, lenders' loan funds are likely to go to borrowers other than those chosen by the lenders. However, since the pay-back behaviour of the specific borrower chosen by the lender does influence whether or not the lender gets their funds back (except when an MFI has chosen to cover for borrower defaults), there is at least some connection between the lender and the specific borrower. Whether lenders' preferences are used for lender preference trend analysis by any field partners or Kiva is not stated. Kiva's response has been to keep pre-disbursing but be clearer about the process.

Full-repayment frequency uncertainty

Whether defaults are extremely low has been questioned on the ground that a field partner may pay Kiva for loans defaulted to the field partner in order to maintain the field partner's good credit with Kiva. Whether interest rates collected by field partners are enough to pay for significant defaults depends on local economic conditions for each field partner.

Controversial loans

In 2008, Kiva featured the borrowing profile of a Peruvian woman asking for a loan to buy equipment for her cockfighting business. This sparked debate among the Kiva lending community; many complained that the organization was promoting cruelty to animals. Matt Flannery defended Kiva's decision to allow the post to remain; he asserted that removing the post would be "paternalistic" and that "Cockfighting in Peru is legal and part of a rich cultural tradition," adding that lenders could "be the ones voting with their dollars."

Promotions and marketing strategies 

In March 2012, Reid Hoffman, LinkedIn's co-founder, lent Kiva $1 million. Kiva then allowed 40,000 people to lend $25 for "free". Lenders still choose a borrower, but the borrower will pay back Hoffman instead of the lender who chose them. Kiva hopes that the "free" users will lend to more of their projects, and thus increase their overall user base.

In his 2007 book Giving: How Each of Us Can Change the World, Bill Clinton covers Kiva.org and the work the organization is currently doing and has done in the past.

External reviews 

The following independent entities have reviewed Kiva.

 On October 1, 2019, charity evaluator Charity Navigator downgraded Kiva from 4 (out of 4) to 3 stars, but by 2020 it was rated 4 stars again. Kiva has been top-rated at 4 stars since 2010 (with the exception of 2018 through mid-2019).
 In 2013, foundation Google.org conducted extensive due diligence on Kiva and awarded it a $3 million Global Impact Award for the creation of Kiva Labs.
 In 2012, charity evaluator Philanthropedia awarded Kiva its Top Non-Profit Award based on topic area expert opinions. 
 In 2011, The Economist honored Kiva with its Innovation Award.
 In 2010, foundation Omidyar Network conducted extensive due diligence and awarded Kiva a $5 million grant to scale its impact.
 In 2010, Kiva was selected as one of Oprah's Ultimate Favorite Things.
 In 2009, charity evaluator GiveWell published a generic critique of giving marketplaces including Kiva and Global Giving, and specific critiques of Kiva. 
 In 2008, TIME magazine named Kiva a Top 50 website.
 In 2007, Skoll Foundation conducted extensive due diligence and awarded Kiva a $1 million grant as part of its recognition of the world's best social enterprises.

See also

References

External links 

 
 Kiva Friends web forum
 
 Podcast interview with Jessica Jackley Flannery, Feb 2008
 Interview with Premal Shah, President of Kiva
 PBS's Frontline - World on Kiva
 TED: Jessica Jackley: Poverty, money -- and love
 Interview with Matt Flannery, Aug 2007

Microfinance organizations
Non-profit organizations based in San Francisco
Peer-to-peer charities
Peer-to-peer lending companies
American fundraising websites
Organizations established in 2005
Charities based in California
501(c)(3) organizations
Online nonprofit organizations

ca:Kiva